James Robert McClelland (3 June 1915 – 16 January 1999) was an Australian lawyer, politician, and judge. He was a member of the Australian Labor Party (ALP) and served as a Senator for New South Wales from 1971 to 1978. He briefly held ministerial office in the Whitlam Government in 1975 as Minister for Manufacturing Industry and Minister for Labor and Immigration. He later served as the inaugural Chief Judge of the Land and Environment Court of New South Wales from 1980 to 1985, as well as presiding over the 1984 McClelland Royal Commission into British nuclear tests in Australia.

Early life
McClelland was born in Melbourne and educated at St Patrick's College, Ballarat. He graduated with a Bachelor of Arts from Melbourne University in 1936. Under the influence of Laurie Short, he became a Trotskyist and joined the Federated Ironworkers' Association of Australia. He served in the Royal Australian Air Force between 1943 and 1946. After the war, he studied law, graduating with a Bachelor of Laws from the University of Sydney in 1950.

The legal practice of McClelland dealt mainly with workers' compensation claims. He played a large part (with Bob Santamaria) in helping Laurie Short take control of the Federated Ironworkers' Association from the Communist Ernie Thornton. He abandoned Trotskyism and joined the Labor Party.

Senate
McClelland was elected to represent New South Wales for the ALP in the 1970 Senate election, his term to begin on 1 July 1971.  In March 1971 he was appointed to a casual vacancy for the remainder of the term of the late senator  James Ormonde.  He was again elected in the double dissolution election of May 1974.  In the Third Whitlam Ministry he was Minister for Manufacturing Industry from 10 February to 6 June 1975.  From 6 June to 11 November 1975 he was Minister for Labor and Immigration and Minister assisting the Prime Minister in matters relating to the Public Service.  He was again elected at the December 1975 double dissolution election.  During the 1970s McClelland worked for the United States of America in what a historian has called "a discreet relationship". He resigned from the Senate on 21 July 1978.

Later life
In 1980 McClelland was appointed the first chief judge of the Land and Environment Court of NSW, holding that office until his 70th birthday in June 1985.

In 1984, as Justice McClelland, he was President of the Royal Commission into British nuclear tests in Australia at Maralinga.

He was reviled by the right as is indicated in Roderick Meagher's portrait in Quadrant, and associated with Edmund Campion, Patrick White, Manning Clark and Donald Horne.

Family
McClelland married three times:
 in 1947 to Nora Fitzer with whom he adopted two children but divorced in 1968
 in 1968 to Freda Watson who brought three stepchildren. She died in 1976
 in 1978 to Gillian Appleton.

Notes

References

Bibliography
Portraits: Jim McClelland, Quadrant, June 2005 – 49:6 [Accessed 4 March 2006]
James McClelland, (1988), Stirring the Possum: A Political Autobiography, Penguin, Sydney 
James McClelland, (1989), An Angel Bit The Bride Penguin 
Gillian Appleton, (2000), Diamond Cuts: An Affectionate Memoir of Jim McClelland Macmillan

External links
From the State Memorial Service for Jim McClelland at The Whitlam Institute website
 

1915 births
1999 deaths
Australian Labor Party members of the Parliament of Australia
1975 Australian constitutional crisis
Australian royal commissioners
Members of the Australian Senate
Members of the Australian Senate for New South Wales
Members of the Cabinet of Australia
People educated at St Kevin's College, Melbourne
20th-century Australian lawyers
20th-century Australian politicians
People educated at St Patrick's College, Ballarat
Royal Australian Air Force personnel of World War II